The 2007 Casino Rama Curling Skins Game on TSN was held on December 8th and 9th at the Casino Rama Entertainment Centre in Rama, Ontario. It was the first TSN Skins Game put on since it was put on hiatus in 2004. The total purse for the event was CAD$100,000.

Four teams were invited to participate. They played one semi-final each on December 8th, and the winners played in the final on December 9th. All three games were shown on TSN and TSN-HD. Kevin Martin's team was the big winner, taking home $61,000.

Teams

Team Gushue
St. John's Curling Club, St. John's, Newfoundland and Labrador

Skip: Brad Gushue
Third: Mark Nichols
Second: Chris Schille
Lead: David Noftall

Team Howard
Coldwater and District Curling Club, Coldwater, Ontario

Skip: Glenn Howard
Third: Richard Hart
Second: Brent Laing
Lead: Craig Savill

Team Martin
Saville Sports Centre, Edmonton, Alberta

Skip: Kevin Martin
Third: John Morris
Second: Marc Kennedy
Lead: Ben Hebert

Team Middaugh
St. George's Golf and Country Club, Toronto, Ontario

Skip: Wayne Middaugh
Third: Jon Mead
Second: Ian Tetley
Lead: Scott Bailey

Draw to the button
Team Martin won the draw to the button contest to determine seeding. This awarded them an extra $1000.

Games
Semi-final dollar amounts
1st & 2nd end: $1000
3rd & 4th end: $1500
5th end: $2000
6th end: $3000
7th end: $4500
8th end: $6500

Middaugh vs. Howard
December 8, 1:00pm EST

Martin vs. Gushue
December 8, 7:00pm EST

* - Draw to the button

Final
December 9, 1:00pm EST

Final game dollar amounts
1st & 2nd end: $2000
3rd & 4th end: $3000
5th end: $4000
6th end: $6000
7th end: $9000
8th end: $13000
+ $15000 bonus for the winner

Total winnings
Team Martin: $61,000
Team Middaugh: $29,000
Team Gushue: $6,000
Team Howard: $4,000
Total Purse: $100,000

Casino Rama Curling Skins Game, 2007
TSN Skins Game
December 2007 sports events in Canada
2007 in Ontario
Curling in Ontario
Sport in Simcoe County